The CBA All-Star-Game was a basketball event organised by the CBA from 1979 until 2008. It started originally in 1949 as the EBA All-Star Game, and in 1971 it became the EPSBL All-Star Game, following the League's name changes. In 1979 CBA organised its first event under the CBA logo and it had been known as the CBA All-Star Classic. Overall, it predates the NBA All-Star Game by two years, as the latter took place for first time in 1951.The players who hold the record with the most CBA All-Star appearances since 1979 are former NBA star Tim Legler, Ronnie Fields and Claude Gregory who also had a brief NBA spell. Additionally the coaches with the most appearances since 1979 are Eric Musselman with 5, Paul Woolpert, Chris Daleo and Dan Panaggio with 4 and Bill Musselman with 3.
The slam-dunk contest was added on the 1988 edition and the long distance shoot contest on the 1990 and onwards.

All-Star Game Results 
Note: Stadium names are named based on the name at the day of the All-Star Game.

EBA 1949-1970, EPBL 1971-1978, CBA 1979-2008

Wins by team (1949-2008)

Most Valuable Player Award winners 

1961 –  Alex "Boo" Ellis, Wilkes-Barre Barons
1963 –  Bobby McNeill, Camden Bullets
1964 –  Jimmie Hadnot, Trenton Colonials
1965 –  Bobby McNeill, Camden Bullets
1966 –  Walt Simon, Allentown Jets
1967 –  Willie Murrell, Scranton Miners
1968 –  Willis "Spider" Bennett, Hartford Capitols
1969 –  Jim Jackson, Scranton Miners
1970 –  John Savage, Wilmington Blue Bombers
1971 –  Willie Somerset, Scranton Apollos
1972 –  Reggie Lacefield, Hartford Capitols
1977 –  Jim Bostic, Jersey Shore Bullets
1978 –  Jim Bostic, Jersey Shore Bullets
1979 –  Andre McCarter, Rochester Zeniths
1982 –  Brad Branson, Anchorage Northern Knights
1983 –  Larry Spriggs, Albany Patroons
1984 –  Anthony Roberts, Wyoming Wildcatters
1985 –  Rick Lamb, Wyoming Wildcatters
1986 –  Don Collins, Tampa Bay Thrillers
1987 –  Eddie Johnson, Tampa Bay Thrillers
1988 –  Michael Brooks, Albany Patroons
1989 –  Dwayne McClain, Rockford Lightning
1990 –  Conner Henry, Rapid City Thrillers
1991 –  Vincent Askew, Albany Patroons
1992 –  Conner Henry, Yakima Sun Kings
1993 –  Pat Durham, Fargo-Moorhead Fever
1994 –  Jeff Martin, Grand Rapids Hoops
1995 –  Tony Dawson, Rockford Lightning
1996 –  Shelton Jones, Florida Beachdogs
1997 –  Dexter Boney, Florida Beachdogs
2000 –  Dontae' Jones, LaCrosse Bobcats
2003 –  Versile Shaw, Sioux Falls Skyforce
2004 –  Roberto Bergersen, Idaho Stampede
2005 –  Sam Clancy, Jr., Idaho Stampede
2006 –  Randy Holcomb, Gary Steelheads
2007 –  Ralph Holmes, Yakama Sun Kings
2008 –  Odell Bradley, Butte Daredevils

Slam-Dunk champions (1988-2008)

Long Distance Shootout Contest

Top Scorers 

1959 –  Bill Spivey, West All Stars, 28 pts
1961 –  Boo Ellis, East All Stars, 29 pts
1962 –  Ed Burton, Allentown Jets, 32 pts
1963 –  Paul Arizin, Camden Bullets, 35 pts
1964 –  Jimmy Hadnot, South All Stars, 31 pts
1965 –  Bobby McNeil, Camden Bullets, 29 pts
1966 –  Walt Simon, East All Stars, 37 pts
1967 –  Art Heyman, East All Stars, 39 pts
1968 –  Spider Bennett, East All Stars, 36 pts
1969 –  Phil Schoff, East All Stars, 22 pts  & Willie Davis, West All Stars, 22 pts
1970 –  Stan Pawlak, EPBL All Stars, 39 pts
1971 –  Willie Somerset, EBA All Stars, 36 pts
1972 –  Chuck Lloyd, Scranton Apollos, 27 pts
1976 –  Charlie Criss, EBA All Stars, 35 pts
1977 –  Major Jones, Allentown Jets, 27 pts
1978 –  Jim Bostic, East All Stars, 26 pts
1979 –  Ron Davis, CBA All Stars, 47 pts
1983 –  Larry Spriggs, Albany Patroons, 22 pts
1984 –  Anthony Roberts, Wyoming Wildcatters, 43 pts
1985 –  Rick Lamb, CBA All Stars, 19 pts
1986 –  Don Collins, CBA All Stars, 21 pts
1987 –  Eddie Johnson, CBA All Stars, 22 pts
1988 –  Jerome Batiste, Topeka Sizzlers, 21 pts
1988-89 –  Dwayne McClain, CBA All Stars, 18 pts
1990 –  Tim Legler, National Conference, 17 pts
1991 –  Mario Elie, National Conference, 22 pts
1992 –  Stephen Thompson, American Conference, 22 pts
1993 –  Pat Durham, National Conference, 22 pts
1994 –  Jeff Martin, American Conference, 20 pts
1995 –  Tony Dawson, American Conference, 25 pts
1996 –  Sam Mack, American Conference, 22 pts
1997 –  Dexter Boney, American Conference, 25 pts
2000 –  Dontae' Jones, Eastern Conference, 34 pts
2003 –  Versile Shaw, National Conference, 27 pts
2004 –  Roberto Bergersen, American Conference, 27 pts
2005 –  Sam Clancy Jr., Western Conference, 19 pts
2006 –  David Jackson, Western Conference, 22 pts
2007 –  Erick Barkley, American Conference, 25 pts

Highest attendances

All-Star Coaches

Coaches 1979-2008

Coaches with most victories

All-Star Players

Players with most appearances (1979-2008)

Notable CBA All-Stars

 Paul Arizin (1963, 1964, 1965)
 Larry Ayuso (2003)
 Anthony Bonner (2004)
 Don Collins (1986, 1987)
 Winston Crite (1990)
 Lloyd Daniels (1988, 1995)
 Darryl Dawkins (1996)
 Mario Elie (1991)
  Scott Fisher (1990)
 Alphonso Ford (1994, 1995)
 Tom Hemans (1958, 1959, 1962, 1966)
 Conner Henry (1990, 1992)
 Anthony Goldwire (1996, 2004)
 Derrick Gervin (1990, 1992)
 Shelton Jones (1993, 1996
 Eddie L. Johnson (1987)
 Bob Love (1966)
 Pace Mannion (1988-89)
 Anthony Mason (1991)
 John Starks (1990)
 Charles Smith (1995, 2000)
 Roy Tarpley (2004)
 Clinton Wheeler (1986, 1994)

References

See also 
 Continental Basketball Association
 Continental Basketball Association franchise history
 List of Continental Basketball Association Champions
 List of Continental Basketball Association MVP's and Notable Alumni
 List of developmental and minor sports leagues

All
Basketball games in the United States
Basketball all-star games